Adam Eckersley may refer to:

 Adam Eckersley (footballer) (born 1985), English footballer
 Adam Eckersley (musician) (born 1982), Australian singer, guitarist and songwriter

See also
 Adam Eckersley Band